The Kiani Crown was the traditional coronation crown in the Iranian Crown Jewels, worn by the Qajar shahs of Iran (1789–1925). The crown was designed under the first Qajar shah Agha Mohammad Khan Qajar as a way to connect himself to the ancient Sasanian shahs (224–651) and mythological  Kiyani shahs.

The crown itself is made of red velvet, on which thousands of gems were set. The Kiani Crown is highly decorated, possessing 1800 small pearls stitched onto it, with many having only 7 millimetres in diameter. It has approximately 300 emeralds and 1,800 rubies. The crown is 32 cm (12.5 in.) high and 19.5 cm (7.5 in.) wide. It is currently kept in the National Treasury of Iran in Tehran.

Reza Shah, the founder of the Pahlavi dynasty, had his own Pahlavi Crown designed, but the Kiani Crown was present during his coronation in 1926.

Middle and New Persian kay(an) originates from Avestan kavi (or kauui) "king" and also "poet-sacrificer" or "poet-priest".

See also

Imperial Crown Jewels of Iran
Kayani (disambiguation)

References

Sources

External links

 Image of the Kiani Crown

Individual crowns
Iranian National Jewels
Kiani
National symbols of Iran
Qajar Iran